Gakiyeh (also Romanized as Gākīyeh and Gākeyeh; also known as Gākia) is a village in Dorudfaraman Rural District, in the Central District of Kermanshah County, Kermanshah Province, Iran. At the 2006 census, its population was 520, in 115 families.

References 

Populated places in Kermanshah County